Role-playing games made in Japan made their first appearance during the 1980s. Today, there are hundreds of Japanese-designed games as well as several translated games.

History

Early years
In the 1970s, role-playing games themselves received little to no attention in Japan as games only had English titles. Several gaming magazines and computer magazines started introducing role-playing games in early 1980s.

Some of the earliest Japanese RPGs were science fiction titles, including Donkey Commando in 1982 and Enterprise: Role Play Game in Star Trek in 1983. Classic Traveller was the first translated RPG in 1984, with Dungeons & Dragons (Mentzer basic red box edition) following in 1985. One of the earliest Japanese-designed traditional fantasy RPGs was titled Roads to Lord, published in 1984.

Late 1980s to early '90s: success of Group SNE
It was not until the late 1980s, when role-playing video games such as Dragon Quest and Final Fantasy, modeled after the western computer RPGs Wizardry and Ultima, helped popularize the traditional role-playing games. The first Dragon Quest was published by Enix in 1986 for the NES and MSX/MSX2 platform. 
 
Around the same time Group SNE pioneered a new book genre called replays consisting of session logs arranged for publication. The first replay, Record of Lodoss War, was a replay of Dungeons & Dragons that was published in Comptiq magazine beginning in 1986. It became a popular series, and led to an increase in interest in the fantasy genre.

Sword World RPG was published in 1989 and became popular very quickly. A notable feature found in Sword World was the Forcelia setting which included Lodoss island from the Record of Lodoss War. An analysis of the game's success suggests that the designers took ideas from many famous American games including D&D, AD&D, Middle-earth Role Playing, and RuneQuest and modified the settings to suit Japanese tastes. Compared to (A)D&D and other contemporary games, Sword World RPG had a flexible, less restricted, multi-class system. It used only ordinary 6-sided dice since other polyhedral dice were uncommon, especially in rural Japan. It was tied up with light novels and replays. The paperback (bunkobon) rulebooks are inexpensive and portable.

Notable role-playing games in mid-late '80s and early '90s included:

Late 1990s and early 2000s: the Winter Age and beyond
In the mid to late 1990s, the RPG craze ended (see History of role-playing games). Role-playing games were surpassed by trading card games (TCGs) such as Pokémon Trading Card Game and Magic: The Gathering; and most RPG magazines were transformed into TCG magazines, or simply discontinued and replaced with then-nascent Waifu culture magazines, with much to the dismay of RPG fans. This period is called the "Winter Age" of TRPGs by Japanese gamers.

The "Thawing" or "Spring Age" spans from 1999-2003. Notable role-playing games of this age are Blade of Arcana (1999), Double Cross (2001), Night Wizard! (2002) and Alshard (2002). Role&Roll magazine was established in 2003. In 2007, Night Wizard! was adapted into an anime television series. Alshard's game system was expanded into a generic role-playing game system named Standard RPG System in 2006. They were all made by F.E.A.R., which grew to be one of the leading RPG companies in Japan.

Console and computer RPGs and the rise of online gaming had a profound influence during this period. For example, Alshard is inspired by Final Fantasy and Arianrhod RPG (2004) is inspired by .hack, Ragnarok Online and alike. Story-oriented games are also influenced by various foreign role-playing games, such as Cyberpunk 2020, Torg and World of Darkness.

Late 2000s and 2010s: resurgence by fan videos and web novels
Since the late 2000s, RPG fan replay videos have grown in popularity on Niconico, a Japanese video hosting service. In the replay videos, popular RPGs are Western Call of Cthulhu and Paranoia. In 2013, Adventure Planning Service released Kill Death Business, a TV-show concept PvP RPG, and it quickly spread in Niconico.

Also, the rise of web novels has been a major influence to the Japanese fantasy and RPG scene. Log Horizon TRPG was released in 2014. "Role-playing fiction" Red Dragon was animated under the moniker Chaos Dragon in 2015. Goblin Slayer TRPG  was published in 2019.

Replays 

Replays are RPG session logs arranged for reading, similar in style to light novels. A typical format of a replay goes as following: Game master: In this scene, you should think the reason why your PCs team up the party with each other.
 Amu: Well, I will visit Eiji's home, because Eiji became an adventurer. At last, he will repay the money he borrowed from me.
 Eiji: Hi, Amu. I became an adventurer at long last. Please lend your money to me again. (Haha.) I don't have money, because I bought chainmail.

In Japan, a lot of RPG replays are commercially published. Replays are more popular than RPG novels and considered as a way of promoting and supporting said game systems.  Not only replays of Japanese games but also replays of translated games such as GURPS, D&D, Shadowrun, and WFRP were published.

Japanese games

Characteristics 
Japanese RPGs tend to be built around shorter campaigns or one-off sessions. Oftentimes long-term campaign play with homebrew settings is not accounted for nor is the focus of the game system. Due to limited living space and the lack of home party culture, Japanese players tend to gather at gaming stores, cafe or public halls to play their games.

Also as stated above, tabletop RPGs in Japan gained recognition and popularity after CRPGs did, unlike the Western world where tabletop came first and gave birth to CRPGs. Influences from CRPGs, anime and manga culture are almost imperious, and in many cases such Japanese franchises are adapted into tabletop RPGs and not so much the other way around. Almost all RPGs feature anime-influenced art, many of which are done by TCG artists. Replays can be considered as a sub-genre to light novels or a form of anime-manga culture tie-in.

Market and companies 
In Japan, domestically-made role-playing games are competitive in the market. Despite the market's small size, many original products are published. For example, 95 domestically-made RPG rulebooks, excluding supplements, were published from 2000 to 2007. In the same period of time, 25 translated RPG rulebooks were published. Despite the competitive nature of Japanese RPGs, nearly all of them are published by Kadokawa Future Publishing conglomerate.

Sword World RPG, a traditional fantasy RPG produced by Group SNE, has been popular since its original release in 1989 and revisions in 1996, 2008, 2012 and 2018. In addition, there are several original settings for GURPS made by Group SNE.  Most games of SNE were tied up with light novels or anime such as Record of Lodoss War, Legend of Crystania and Rune Soldier.

F.E.A.R. (FarEast Amusement Research) (ja) games are more heroic and dramatic than usual games. Characters seen in Tokyo NOVA, Blade of Arcana and Alshard are mighty heroes who possess superhuman powers. Also, several connection rules represent dramatic human relationships.

Adventure Planning Service (Bouken Kikaku-kyoku) (ja) produced SATASUPE (2003), Meikyu kingdom (ja) (2004), Saikoro Fiction system (ja), (Shinobigami, ja) (2009), Reality Show RPG: Kill Death Business (ja) (2013), and more).

Translated games

From English to Japanese 
According to the publisher's press releases in 2019, translated copies of first (2004) to fifth edition core rulebooks of Call of Cthulhu cumulatively sold 200,000 copies domestically. D&D is fairly popular, and has been translated over six editions. Several Japanese games using the D20 System, which is based on the third edition of D&D, have been developed. However, due to the existence of large competitors, its bumpy releases among editions and limited availability, it does not dominate the market.

Other translated systems include Fighting Fantasy (including Advanced Fighting Fantasy), GURPS, Hero Wars, RuneQuest, Shadowrun, Stormbringer, Traveller, Tunnels and Trolls, Warhammer Fantasy Roleplay and World of Darkness (Vampire:The Masquerade etc.) systems.  Each title has been translated several times, releasing many different editions. Some games were modified in Japanese and later released, such as RuneQuest 90's and Hyper Tunnels and Trolls. More recently, Pathfinder was translated and published in 2018.

Many minor products, such as Cyberpunk 2020, d20 Modern, Dark Conspiracy, Dragon Warriors, Earthdawn, The Fantasy Trip, Fiasco, HârnMaster, It Came From The Late, Late, Late Show, James Bond 007, Maelstrom, MechWarrior, Marvel Heroic, Middle-earth Role Playing, The Monster Horror Show, Pugmire, Rolemaster, Torg  have also been translated.

From Japanese to other languages 
The first RPG translated from Japanese into another language was the Sword World RPG.  Its basic rulebook and scenarios were translated into Korean. (:ko:소드 월드 RPG)

In 2008, the Maid RPG was completely translated from Japanese into English. Tenra Bansho Zero was projected to be the first translation into English; however, Maid was completed first. The original PDF release of Maid had to be re-edited, due to the controversial content it contained.

In 2013, the 3rd Edition of "Double Cross" by F.E.A.R was released in English by Ver. Blue Amusement.

In 2013, Ryuutama was translated into French by editor Lapin Marteau.

See also 
History of Eastern role-playing video games
History of role-playing games
List of best-selling Japanese role-playing game franchises

References

External links 
 TRPG.NET Wiki for English
 Group SNE 
 FarEast Amusement Research 
 Adventure Planning Service 
 Dungeons & Dragons Japanese official site 
 Japanese Rules Cyclopedia
 website of french publisher of Ryuutama 

 
Japanese popular culture